Jaakko Tapani Laakso (born 20 May 1948 in Turku) is a Finnish leftwing politician and member of Parliament between 1991 and 2011, representing Left Alliance. He is a former member of the Communist Party of Finland.

Laakso graduated from University of Helsinki in 1973 and has worked for the communist newspaper Tiedonantaja. His son, Tapio, is former chairman of the Federation of Green Youth and Students.

Suvi-Anne Siimes, former chair of Laakso's political party, stated in her book Politiikan julkisivu (2007) that Laakso advances Russian interests.

In 2014, Mitrokhin Archive documents made public by the Churchill Archives Centre indicated that Laakso had been recruited to the KGB in 1973 and used the codename "Jan".

In a report released by an investigatory body of the Council of Europe focusing of corruption, Laakso was proven to have worked as a lobbyist for the Azerbaijani government mitigating human rights violations in the country. As a result, Laakso was found to have committed a minor breach of the PACE's ethical rules and on 29 June 2018 he received a lifetime ban to the premises of Council of Europe and Parliamentary Assembly.

Sources

External links 
Finnish Parliament:Jaakko Laakso

1948 births
Living people
Politicians from Turku
Communist Party of Finland politicians
Finnish People's Democratic League politicians
Democratic Alternative (Finland) politicians
Left Alliance (Finland) politicians
Members of the Parliament of Finland (1991–95)
Members of the Parliament of Finland (1995–99)
Members of the Parliament of Finland (1999–2003)
Members of the Parliament of Finland (2003–07)
Members of the Parliament of Finland (2007–11)
University of Helsinki alumni